Cathleen "Cathy" Scott (born c. 1950) is a Los Angeles Times and New York Times bestselling American true crime author and investigative journalist who penned the biographies and true crime books The Killing of Tupac Shakur and The Murder of Biggie Smalls, both bestsellers in the United States and United Kingdom, and was the first to report Shakur's death. She grew up in La Mesa, California and later moved to Mission Beach, California, where she was a single parent to a son, Raymond Somers Jr. Her hip-hop books are based on the drive-by shootings that killed the rappers six months apart in the midst of what has been called the West Coast-East Coast war. Each book is dedicated to the rappers' mothers.

Early life and education
Scott was born in San Diego, California. She attended Helix High School in La Mesa, California, Grossmont College and graduated with a bachelor's degree from the University of Redlands in 1990.

Scott is the daughter of author Eileen Rose Busby, and James (Jim) Scott, a Senior Olympics winner who helped pioneer and develop the game of racquetball. She is the granddaughter of California artist Esther Rose and Frank Rose (a sports writer at the Two Harbors, Minnesota, newspaper in the 1920s), and niece of the late Russian Orthodox hieromonk Seraphim Rose.  Her brother is scientist and author J. Michael Scott. Her twin sister Cordelia Mendoza is an antiquarian and appraiser.

Career
Scott wrote poetry as a teenager and worked on the Helix High School yearbook during her senior year. Her first full-time newspaper position was as a reporter for the Beach & Bay Press in Mission Beach and Pacific Beach, in 1987. She also freelanced for the Mira Mesa Scripps Ranch Sentinel. She then became business editor of the La Jolla Light weekly newspaper after winning a Best of Show journalism award out of 1,200 entries from the San Diego Press Club. She then moved to a daily paper, the Vista Press, in North San Diego County. She left the Vista Press to string as a correspondent for the Associated Press and The San Diego Union-Tribune. While reporting in San Diego, she was a member of the San Diego Press Club.

In 1993, she moved to the Mojave Desert as a crime beat reporter for the Las Vegas Sun, where she worked until 1998, then freelanced for The New York Times and Reuters News Service and wrote true-crime books and biographies. While still at the Sun, in 1997, her first book, The Killing of Tupac Shakur, was released. Huntington Press released the book on the first anniversary of Shakur's death, issuing a 25,000-copy first printing, according to Publishers Weekly, with a second edition released in 2002. The Killing of Tupac Shakur was number 2 on the Los Angeles Times bestseller list in paperback nonfiction the week of June 11, 2000. The Murder of Biggie Smalls the same year made The New York Times bestseller list in nonfiction hardcover the week of October 15, 2000.

Scott's article, first published in George magazine, was included in the 2005 anthology Tupac: A Thug Life, a compilation of national magazine writers released by Plexus Publishing. She contributed to two other anthologies, The Big Book of Social Media (Yorkshire Publishing 2010) and Masters of True Crime (Prometheus Books 2012).

Scott has coached writers, including at the Flathead River Writers Conference in Montana and San Diego State University's Writers' Conference.

Scott taught journalism and advanced magazine writing for five years at the University of Nevada, Las Vegas School of Journalism until September 2005, when she traveled to New Orleans as an embedded reporter for Best Friends Animal Society to cover animal rescues in the aftermath of Hurricane Katrina for its magazine and website. On her return from Louisiana, she hired on with Best Friends as a staff writer. She sat as the Nevada State Sunshine Chair for ten years, until 2007, and on the Society of Professional Journalists Sunshine Committee.

From 2005 through 2007, Scott wrote a column titled "Crime & Punishment" for the alternative weekly Las Vegas CityLife.

Her sixth book, Pawprints of Katrina: Pets Saved and Lessons Learned, with photos by Clay Myers and foreword by actress Ali MacGraw, was a result of Scott's four months on the Gulf Coast writing about the largest rescue of animals in U.S. history. Her seventh book, The Rough Guide to True Crime, a title in the Rough Guides series of books, was released in August 2009 and featured at BookExpo America 2009.

She participated in the 2008 National Book Festival, sponsored by the Library of Congress and hosted by First Lady Laura Bush, on the National Mall in Washington, D.C. She was a speaker at the 2011 No More Homeless Pets National Conference. and at the 2012 Vegas Valley Book Festival.

In January 2011, Anderson Cooper's 360° blog included Scott in an update on the Tupac and Smalls cases, quoting her as saying that "the failure to secure the actual scene of the shooting and interview witnesses immediately doomed the investigation."

Her work has appeared in The New York Times when she worked as a Times correspondent for 11 years and a stringer for Reuters, as well as in The New York Times Magazine, New York Post, George magazine, Los Angeles Times, The Christian Science Monitor, San Diego Union-Tribune and Las Vegas Sun.

On KTTV's "Good Day L.A." in March 2013, Scott discussed the verdict against chef David Viens in the disappearance of his wife Dawn.

Scott appeared twice on the public-access TV show Connie Martinson Talks Books in January 2003 to talk about the unsolved killing of Susan Berman and her book Murder of a Mafia Daughter and in November 2000 to discuss rapper The Notorious B.I.G. and the book The Murder of Biggie Smalls. She appeared on three Oxygen network "Snapped" segments concerning murder cases involving women and on Unsolved Mysteries about the Tupac Shakur investigation. In 2010 she appeared in the Discovery Channel's documentary, On the Case with Paula Zahn: Death in the Desert, about the Ted Binion trial. On November 7 and 8, 2015, she appeared on a Fox News special about Robert Durst to discuss details about Berman's relationship with Robert Durst covered in Scott's book Murder of a Mafia Daughter.

Las Vegas CityLife newspaper named Scott's 2003 release, Murder of a Mafia Daughter, "Pick of the Week" in February of that year.

In 2011, she wrote the introduction and foreword to military combat photographer Russell Klika's book Iraq: Through the Eyes of an American Soldier.

Her eighth book, The Millionaire's Wife, about the 1990 contract murder of businessman George Kogan, was released by St. Martin's Press True Crime Library in March 2012. The book was launched at Scott's former high school library in April 2012.

In 2013, The Huffington Post reported that Scott was co-writing, with former drug kingpin "Freeway" Rick Ross, his autobiography, released in 2014. The memoir, Freeway Rick Ross: The Untold Autobiography, was launched at the Eso Won Bookstore in Los Angeles on June 17, 2014, to a standing-room-only crowd.

In May 2014, Scott lodged a complaint with YouTube over a re-created image included in rapper Wyclef Jean's music video "April Showers." The controversy arose after Scott reported to YouTube that no attribution had been given, nor was permission sought for use of an autopsy photo released in Scott's book The Killing of Tupac Shakur. YouTube banned the video. TMZ, which broke the story, reported that video director Hezues R' and Scott had settled the matter and agreed upon a screen credit at the end of the video.

Scott is a contributor to Psychology Today, ForbesWoman blog and Women in Crime Ink, described by The Wall Street Journal as "a blog worth reading."

In March 2015, her book Unconditional Honor: Wounded Warriors and Their Dogs, with photos by Clay Myers and foreword by Bill Walton, was released by Globe Pequot Press.

Scott co-authored The Crime Book volume with American crime writers Shanna Hogan, Lee Mellor, Rebecca Morris and British author Michael Kerrigan, with a foreword for the U.S. edition by Scott and the U.K. edition by author Peter James. It was released in April 2017 in the U.K. and May 2017 in the U.S. by Dorling Kindersley (Penguin Random House). In an August 2017 interview with Rolling Stone magazine, Scott explained the choice of stories for the book: "We tried to include the famous ones, and then some lesser-known. They needed to be from across the world and across the years and across a variety of crimes."

Scott appeared in 2018 as a cast member in season 2 of The First 48: Marcia Clark Investigates in an episode titled "The Spreckels Mansion." Clark scrutinized the death of Rebecca Zahau, whose body was discovered outside the mansion of her boyfriend Jonah Shacknai, which Scott blogged about for Forbes.

Author Ann Rule called Scott “a star writer in the crowded field of true crime.”

Filming in Las Vegas was completed in February 2014 for Death in the Desert, a full-length movie directed and produced by Josh Evans and starring Michael Madsen, Shayla Beesley, Paz de la Huerta, Roxy Saint and Stephen Manley, based on Scott's book Death in the Desert with screenplay by John Steppling.

Awards
Best Political/Governmental Story (1st Place, Beach & Bay Press), San Diego Press Club, 1989
News Feature (2nd Place, The Vista Press), Society of Professional Journalists, 1991
Best of Show (The Vista Press), San Diego Press Club, 1992
Best News Story (1st Place, The Vista Press), San Diego Press Club, 1992
Feature Story Writing (1st Place, The Vista Press), North San Diego County Press Club, 1992
Feature Story (2nd Place, The Vista Press), North San Diego County Press Club, 1992
Best News Story (1st Place, The Vista Press), North San Diego County Press Club, 1992
Deadline News (2nd Place, The Vista Press), Society of Professional Journalists, 1992
Spot News (Honorable Mention, The Vista Press), San Diego Press Club, 1992
Criticism (1st Place, San Diego Union-Tribune), Society of Professional Journalists, 1993
Best Spot News (2nd Place, Las Vegas Sun), Nevada Press Association, 1996
Best Spot News Story (3rd Place, Las Vegas CityLife), Nevada Press Association, 2007
Top 10 Best True Crime Books, True Crime Zine reader's poll, 2012
ForeWord magazine's 2013 Book of the Year Awards, True Crime (finalist)
ForeWord magazine's silver award for 2013 Book of the Year in True Crime
Nominated to the Nevada Writers Hall of Fame, 2014
ForeWord magazine's 2014 Book of the Year Awards, True Crime (finalist)

Filmography

Film
 Death in the Desert (film)

Bibliography

Books

Non-fiction 
 The Killing of Tupac Shakur (2014, 2002, 1997, Huntington Press)
 The Murder of Biggie Smalls (2000, St. Martin's Press)
 Death in the Desert: The Ted Binion Homicide Case (2012, 2000)
 Seraphim Rose: The True Story and Private Letters (2000, Regina Orthodox Press)
 Murder of a Mafia Daughter: The Life and Tragic Death of Susan Berman (2002, Barricade Books)
 Pawprints of Katrina: Pets Saved and Lessons Learned (2008)
 The Rough Guide to True Crime (2009, Penguin)
 The Millionaire's Wife (2012, St. Martin's Press True Crime Library)
 Murder in Beverly Hills (2013, AuthorHouse)
 Freeway Rick Ross: The Untold Autobiography (co-author) (2014, Freeway Studios)
 Hot Blooded, Cold Crime (2014, Crime Rant Classic)
 Unconditional Honor: Wounded Warriors and Their Dogs (2015, Globe Pequot Press)
 Murder of a Mafia Daughter: The Story Behind Suspicions Robert Durst Murdered Susan Berman (2015 2nd ed, Barricade Books)
 Murder of a Mafia Daughter: Robert Durst and Susan Berman: The Shocking Inside Story (2022 3rd anniversary ed., Crime, She Writes)
 The Crime Book (co-authored) (2017, Dorling Kindersley)
 The Murder of Biggie Smalls (2021 2nd ed., Crime, She Writes)

Anthologies (contributor) 
 Tupac: A Thug Life (2005, Plexus Publishing)
 The Big Book of Social Media: Case Studies, Stories, Perspectives (2010, Yorkshire Publishing)
 Masters of True Crime: Chilling Stories of Murder and the Macabre (2012, Prometheus Books)
 The Mob: Inside the Brutal World of the Mafia (2017, TIME-LIFE Books)()

Magazines

Fiction
 Crime mystery series (2013, The Social Media Monthly magazine)

Personal life
She was married to Raymond Somers, with whom she has a son, Raymond Somers Jr. She lives in Julian, California, a mountain town in San Diego County.

References

External links 
 Cathy Scott Official Site
 
 
 St. Martin's Press author bio
 Penguin Random House author bio
 Amazon author page
 Member, Authors Guild
 Writer's Digest, Oct. 2002
 Book publisher defends Shakur photo, Las Vegas Sun, Sept. 1997
 Vegas Valley Book Festival
 truTV Crime Library citation, "Life After Death," by Anthony Bruno for Hip Hop Homicide section
 WorldCat bibliography
 View News, "True-Crime Journalist to Speak to Writers Group," October 19, 2010

1950 births
Year of birth uncertain
Living people

American alternative journalists
American bloggers
American investigative journalists
American journalism academics
American newspaper reporters and correspondents
American non-fiction crime writers
American people of Norwegian descent
American people of Swedish descent
American women journalists
Animal care and training writers
People associated with animal welfare and rights
The New York Times people
Non-fiction writers about organized crime in the United States
Journalists from California
People from the Las Vegas Valley
Writers from San Diego
University of Redlands alumni
University of Nevada, Las Vegas faculty
Writers from Nevada
20th-century American women writers
21st-century American women writers
Tupac Shakur
Educators from California
American women educators
American women bloggers
20th-century American biographers
20th-century American journalists
American women biographers
21st-century American biographers
Women crime writers
Journalists from Las Vegas
People from Julian, California
American military writers
Reuters people
American twins
Identical twin females
Grossmont College alumni